Miguel Cardoso may refer to:

 Abraham Miguel Cardoso (c. 1626–1706), Spanish Jewish prophet and physician
 Miguel Esteves Cardoso (born 1955), Portuguese writer, translator, critic and journalist
 Miguel Cardoso (footballer, born 1994), Portuguese footballer
 Miguel Cardoso (basketball) (born 1993), Portuguese basketball player
 Miguel Cardoso (football manager) (born 1972), Portuguese football manager